Dendropsophus pseudomeridianus is a species of frog in the family Hylidae.
It is endemic to Brazil.
Its natural habitats are moist savanna, subtropical or tropical seasonally wet or flooded lowland grassland, freshwater marshes, intermittent freshwater marshes, arable land, pastureland, plantations, rural gardens, heavily degraded former forest, ponds, and canals and ditches.

References

pseudomeridianus
Endemic fauna of Brazil
Amphibians of Brazil
Amphibians described in 2000
Taxonomy articles created by Polbot